is a railway station on the Aonami Line in Minato-ku, Nagoya, Japan, operated by the third sector railway operator Nagoya Rinkai Rapid Transit.

Lines

Station layout
The station consists of one elevated island platform serving two tracks.

Platforms

Adjacent stations

History 
The station opened on 6 October 2004 as one of the stations constructed along the Aonami Line connecting Nagoya city centre to the Kinjō-futō Station at Nagoya Port.

The station was originally named . The present name is from March 12, 2022.

Surrounding area
The station served the Nagoya Racecourse until its relocation in 2022. In addition, the Nagoya Regional Immigration Services Bureau is located within walking distance from this station.

References

Railway stations in Nagoya
Railway stations in Japan opened in 2004
2004 establishments in Japan